Neoplecostomus jaguari is a species of catfish in the family Loricariidae. It is native to South America, where it occurs in the Jaguari River in the Tietê River basin, which is part of the upper Paraná River system in southeastern Brazil. The species reaches 9.3 cm (3.7 inches) in standard length.

References 

jaguari
Fish described in 2014
Catfish of South America
Freshwater fish of Brazil